The Pertevniyal Valide Sultan Mosque, also known as the Aksaray Valide Mosque, is a grand Ottoman imperial mosque in Istanbul, Turkey. It is located at the intersection of Ordu Street and Atatürk Boulevard in the Aksaray neighborhood beside the Pertevniyal High School (Turkish: Pertevniyal Lisesi) which was also built by the order of Sultana Pertevniyal in 1872. The mosque attracts 400-500 worshipers during prayer times and over 2,500 worshipers during prayer on Fridays.

The mosque's location was regarded as important to the Valide Sultan and royal family, as Aksaray was a vital commercial center during the Ottoman period. At the time what is now a busy pedestrian thoroughfare was known for its overwhelming beauty, with plentiful gardens and orchards.

History
One of the last mosques built in Istanbul during the Ottoman Empire, the Pertevniyal Valide Sultan Mosque was created for Pertevniyal Sultan, wife of Sultan Mahmud II and mother of Sultan Abdülaziz. It was probably designed by Sarkis Bey of the Ottoman Armenian Balyan family of architects. Construction began in November 1869, and the mosque was finished in 1871. An inscription above the gate leading to the courtyard gives the date. Other documents indicate that the foundations were created during different ceremonies in Sha'ban 1285/ November 1869. Pertevniyal Sultan died in 1884, thirteen years after the completion of the mosque, and was then buried within it.

The construction took three years to complete.

After numerous local roadworks, the mosque - approached via a grand gateway adorned with fountains - is now below the level of the surrounding streets.

The mosque was cleaned and restored in the 2010s.

Architecture
The building is an example of Turkish Rococo with dollops of classical Ottoman, Moorish, Turkish, Gothic, Renaissance, and Empire styles. Some regarded the mishmash of styles as garish and short on classical Ottoman grandeur. The use of different elements shows the influence of the eclectic viewpoint common in the late Ottoman era. The design also seems to draw influences from Indian, North African, and Andalusian architecture. It can be seen as a sign of the emerging power of Ottoman women, as the mosque is named after Pertevniyal Valide Sultan, a member of the royal family.

Exterior 
The mosque is the focal point of a complex that includes a tomb, sebil, fountain, time-keeper's room, library, and medrese.

The mosque itself follows the traditional plan with a square prayer-hall that measures 10 m x 10 m, and a single dome. ThIs is separated from the walls and brought inward while being supported on a tall, 12-sided drum. Directly in front of the prayer hall is the portico where latecomers could pray and the sultan's loge. The mosque's east, west and south façades are all embedded with turrets and the outward-facing projections of their central sections are each capped with a triangular pediment. Each piece of the pediment has two rows with three windows as its featured design.

Interior 

The interior is elaborately decorated with much use made of blue colouring. There are many classical Ottoman details on the walls including blind niches, muqarnas, arch motifs, arabesques, and Chinese-inspired floral arrangements. The interior also features a plain marble mihrab and minbar.

The tomb of Sultana Pertevniyal was located in the central mosque.

Architect(s) 
Some believe the mosque was designed by Montani Effendi while others believe it to have been created by Sarkis Balyan. Agop Balyan and Osep may also have had a hand in the design and construction of the mosque. The World Digital Library suggests it was designed by the Turkish Armenian architect Hakob Balyan.

Modifications 
In the year AH 1328/ AD 1911, the medrese of the Pertevniyal Valide Sultain Mosque complex burned down. The time-keeper's room, the sebil, and the tomb were removed during the renovation of Aksaray Square (1956–1959). Parts of the tomb were relocated to the graveyard beside the tomb of Sultan Selim III. Eventually the Valide Sultan's tomb was reconstructed from pieces of the original. Her body was relocated first to the Topkapı Palace, then to the tomb of Sultan Mahmud II, and finally to her own tomb. The mausoleum was eventually demolished in 1958.

Mentions 
A photo-chrome print of the Pertevniyal Valide Sultan Mosque is featured in the “Views of People and Sites in Turkey” from the catalog of the Detroit Publishing Company.

The Pertevniyal Valide Sultan Mosque is mentioned in The Architects of Ottoman Constantinople: The Balyan Family and the History of Ottoman Architecture by Alyson Wharton.

The mosque is mentioned in "RE-THINKING HISTORIOGRAPHY ON OTTOMAN MOSQUE ARCHITECTURE:NINETEENTH CENTURY PROVINCIAL SULTAN MOSQUES; A THESIS SUBMITTED TO THE GRADUATE SCHOOL OF SOCIAL SCIENCES OF MIDDLE EAST TECHNICAL UNIVERSITY" by Ceren Katipoğlu Özmen.

The mosque is featured in the Museum with No Frontiers.

See also
 Ottoman architecture
 List of mosques

Gallery

Notes

References

External links

 Many pictures of this mosque

Ottoman mosques in Istanbul
Mosques completed in 1872
19th-century mosques
Fatih
19th-century religious buildings and structures in Turkey